At least two vessels have been named Pusey Hall (or Pusy Hall), for Pusey Hall Great House, Clarendon Parish, Jamaica:

 , of 200 tons (bm), was launched at Lancaster in 1784 as a West Indiaman. Pusey Hall, R.Simpson, master, was driven ashore at Cape Lookout, North Carolina in 1790. She was on a voyage from Jamaica to Virginia. A source on shipwrecks in the Americas misidentified her as American.
  was launched at Lancaster in 1808 as a West Indiaman. Between 1830 and 1837 she made two voyages as a whaler in the British southern whale fishery. She returned to trade and was wrecked at Patagonia in 1846 while engaged in the guano trade.

Citations and references
Citations

References
  

Ship names